Elegy was the final official album release by the Nice, Keith Emerson having moved on to Emerson, Lake & Palmer, Lee Jackson to Jackson Heights and Brian Davison to Every Which Way. It consists of live versions of songs from earlier releases and a cover of "My Back Pages". Released after the Nice had disbanded, the album achieved number 5 in the UK album chart.

"Hang on to a Dream" and "America" were recorded live at Fillmore East, New York during the group's 1969 tour.

Cover art

The UK edition came in a gatefold sleeve. It was designed by Hipgnosis (Storm Thorgerson and Aubrey Powell), well known as designers of album covers for Pink Floyd and other progressive rock bands. The front and back covers show a Sahara desert scene with a line of fifty red footballs (credited to Mettoy Playcraft) receding towards a distant dune. The inside of the cover shows, in the distance, a mesa or plateau; in front is a gravelly landscape strewn with memorabilia of the Nice such as older album covers, publicity shots, press releases and a scrapbook of press cuttings.

Track listing

Side one
 "Hang On to a Dream" (Live) (Tim Hardin) – 12:43
 "My Back Pages" (Bob Dylan) – 9:12

Side two
 "Third Movement, Pathetique" (Group Only) (Tchaikovsky; arranged by The Nice) – 7.05
 "America" (Live) (Leonard Bernstein, Stephen Sondheim, The Nice)  – 10:27

Personnel
The Nice
 Keith Emerson – piano, organ
 Lee Jackson – bass guitar, vocals
 Brian Davison – drums, percussion

References

1971 albums
Albums with cover art by Hipgnosis
Albums with cover art by Storm Thorgerson
Live at the Fillmore East albums
The Nice albums
Charisma Records albums
1971 live albums
Live progressive rock albums
Charisma Records live albums
Mercury Records albums
Mercury Records live albums
Albums produced by Brian Davison (drummer)
Albums produced by Lee Jackson (bassist)
Albums produced by Keith Emerson
Covers albums
Philips Records albums
Philips Records live albums